Kur Bonav (also Romanized as Kūr Bonāv; also known as Kūr Bonāb) is a village in Baryaji Rural District, in the Central District of Sardasht County, West Azerbaijan Province, Iran. At the 2006 census, its population was 362, in 62 families.

References 

Populated places in Sardasht County